Yusuf Maitama Tuggar (born 12 March 1967) is a Nigerian politician and diplomat who since 2017 is the Nigerian Ambassador to Germany. He was previously a member of the Nigerian House of Representatives from 2007 to 2011 representing Gamawa; and he has run twice for Governor of Bauchi State.

Family 
Tuggar was born into a political family in Bauchi State (Gamawa), his father was the Organizing Secretary of the ruling Northern People's Congress in the period before and after Nigerian Independence in 1960, who later became a Senator in the Second Nigerian Republic.

Education 
Tuggar received a bachelor's degree in international relations from the United States International University. He also attended the University of Bath, and has master's degree from the University of Cambridge.

Early career 
After graduating, Tuggar spent several years in the private sector. He was the chief executive officer of Nordic Oil and Gas Services, an energy consulting firm. Tuggar was also a contributor on political and economic opinions in Nigerian newspapers and magazines.

Political career

House of Representatives 
Tuggar represented Gamawa from Bauchi State in the Nigerian House of Representatives from 2007 to 2011. He served as the Chairman of the House Committee on Public Procurement, regulating government spending in the oil and gas industry, education, health and water resources, the committee worked on separating the president's cabinet from affairs of awarding contracts.

He also oversaw the creation of the National Council on Public Procurement,  and was the member of the house committee that worked on Local content bill with a focus in oil and gas. He was also as a member of the house committees on foreign affairs and was the deputy chairman of the house on Public Petitions. He sponsored a bill on inhumane transport of livestock on the floor of the house.

Governorship elections 
In 2011, Tuggar ran for office of the Governor of Bauchi State as the candidate of the Congress for Progressive Change, Tuggar came in second after the election was marred with fraud and violence. In 2013, he joined the ruling All Progressives Congress and contested the governorship primaries coming in third.

Ambassador to Germany 
In August 2017, Tuggar was appointed the Nigerian Ambassador to Germany by President Muhammadu Buhari. During his ambassadorship, Tuggar played a key role during the 23rd Session of the Conference of the Parties to the United Nations Framework Convention on Climate Change. He also facilitated the state visit of the German Chancellor Angela Merkel to Nigeria in August 2018.

In March 2020, Tuggar attended a meeting held with Siemens in Germany over projects in the Nigerian power sector, the chief of staff to the president Abba Kyari who tested positive for COVID-19. Tuggar ordered the closure of the embassy in Berlin, and himself was tested negative. Kyari later died on 17 April 2020.

References

Living people
Nigerian diplomats
Ambassadors of Nigeria to Germany
1967 births